Zeylab Hasan Jan (also Romanized as Zeylāb Ḩasan Jān) is a village in Shahi Rural District, Sardasht District, Dezful County, Khuzestan Province, Iran. At the 2006 census, its population was 48, in 9 families.

References 

Populated places in Dezful County